The cinnamon-colored Oldfield mouse (Thomasomys cinnameus), also called the "cinnamon-colored Thomasomys", is a species of rodent in the family Cricetidae. It has terrestrial habits, and has been found in cloud forest and mossy areas. It was formerly considered a subspecies of T. gracilis.

References

Mammals of Ecuador
Mammals of Colombia
Thomasomys
Mammals described in 1924